Shirley Anne Walker (née Rogers; April 10, 1945 – November 30, 2006) was an American film and television composer and conductor. She was one of the few female film score composers working in Hollywood. Walker was one of the first female composers to earn a solo score credit on a major Hollywood motion picture (preceded by Suzanne Ciani, 1981) and according to the Los Angeles Times, is remembered as a pioneer for women in the film industry.

Walker often wrote her film scores entirely by hand, and always orchestrated and conducted her own scores by herself.

She won two Emmy Awards during her career, while the ASCAP Shirley Walker Award was created in her honor in 2014.

Early life and family
Walker (née Rogers) was born in Napa, California on April 10, 1945. She was born to her father who was an industrial patternmaker for the Navy and her mother gave piano lessons while raising five children. She grew up in Napa Valley and Contra Costa County. She attended Pleasant Hill High School. Walker was a musical prodigy. She had an early start performing as a teenager at various hotels, jazz and art bands in 1964-1967. Walker was also a piano soloist with the San Francisco Symphony during high school, and later attended San Francisco State University on a piano scholarship. She studied music composition under Roger Nixon and piano studies with Harald Logan of Berkeley, California.

Walker went on to marry Don Walker in 1967. Don Walker died March 2006. They had two sons Colin Walker, born 1970, and Ian Walker born shortly after in 1972.

Early career 
Shortly after graduating from Pleasant Hill High School, Shirley composed the score for a full length musical adaptation of Moliere's "The Imaginary Invalid" called "Make Way For Love", with book & lyrics by W. Grant Gray. It had its world premiere at the high school, with Shirley playing keyboards with a quartet at all performances.

For several years, she wrote jingles and composed for industrial films. Walker's career in film began in 1979, when she was hired to play the synthesizers on Carmine Coppola's score for Apocalypse Now. Her work and arrangements can be heard, eerily interwoven throughout the film. Notably during cues like “Do Lung” and “The Delta”. Almost immediately, she would work again with Carmine, orchestrating the score for The Black Stallion (1979) as well as writing additional cues, receiving credits such as “Additional music by” or even “Co-composed by”. This gave her an official start and made her one of the rare and few female film composers of the time alongside Wendy Carlos, Rachel Elkind, Delia Derbyshire, Angela Morley, and Suzanne Ciani. However, what made Shirley stand out among her peers was her ability to work with an orchestra and this talent would come to shape so many beloved film scores.

Career

Conducting, Orchestrating/Arranging, Scoring for Film and TV 
Her apprenticeship in film music included working as orchestrator and conductor, working with a substantial list of established film composers such as Danny Elfman, Hans Zimmer, Brad Fiedel, Mark Snow and Carter Burwell. To be a composer is not unusual. Nor is it to be an orchestrator or a conductor. What is unusual, is to be one that does all three, and Shirley was exactly that. She knew exactly how music worked, how it was written, and how (or if) it could be played by musicians. Her roles would include making sure each cue was recorded how it needed to be with the speed, tone, and musical sound design in mind, based on the composer’s wishes as well as her own.

While she was still writing for television in the early 1980s, Shirley would be frequently hired by other composers to orchestrate and/or conduct their scores. Some of these included Murder in Coweta Country (1980) for Brad Fiedel, Cujo (1983) for Charles Bernstein, and Ghost Warrior (1984) for Richard Band for which she also wrote additional music. Shirley would also team up with Band as co-composers on The Dungeonmaster (1984) and Ghoulies (1985). Interestingly, Shirley’s imprint makes these latter two scores stand out. The score for Ghoulies specifically sounds much like a classic Danny Elfman score, though it predates Shirley’s work with Danny, and even his very first film score for Pee-wee’s Big Adventure (1985) by six months. Shirley continued to score various television projects and work simultaneously as an orchestrator/conductor into the late 1980s, continuing a long-running collaboration with Brad Fiedel. Around the time of orchestrating and conducting Fiedel’s score for The Accused (1988), Shirley would conduct the score for Scrooged (1988), marking her first work with Danny Elfman.

One of Shirley’s most important efforts was the thankless and uncredited job of conducting the score for National Lampoon’s Christmas Vacation (1989) and later Invisible Man. Chevy Chase, who played the lead in Memoirs, recalled visiting a recording session for Christmas Vacation and being impressed by the conductor. He recommended her and she got the job. Invisible Man would become Shirley Walker’s first, proper, official, solo film score. Shirley has the distinction of being the first woman to have composed an entire symphonic score, which she also orchestrated and conducted alone.Walker was suggested to work on John Carpenter’s Memoirs Of An Invisible Man when Jack Nitzsche fell through – a landmark decision, not just because Carpenter likes to do his own scores, but because it was the first time a female composer had a solo credit on a major studio picture. “The first two days of that score, there were a lot of people who had come to visit the scoring stage because they were here to witness this event,” Shirley said in an interview in a 1998 issue of Soundtrack Magazine. “I was almost in tears about that. I had to ask somebody why all those people were here, and when they told me it was just incredible.” 

In 1992, Walker became one of the first female composers to earn a solo score credit on a major Hollywood motion picture – for John Carpenter's Memoirs of an Invisible Man (one of Carpenter's few films he did not score himself – Walker later collaborated with Carpenter on Escape From L.A.). She would go on to orchestrate and/or conduct his scores for Batman (1989), Nightbreed (1990), Dick Tracy (1990), Darkman (1990), Edward Scissorhands (1990), and finally Article 99 (1992), injecting Elfman’s already-wild, weird, and wicked music with further spirit. Shirley also composed additional cues for both Nightbreed and Dick Tracy, and unless it was Elfman-regular Steve Bartek, she likely orchestrated and conducted the theme for Tales From The Crypt.

Shirley Walker served as composer for numerous productions, including films such as Willard, the first three Final Destination installments, and television series such as Falcon Crest, Space: Above and Beyond, China Beach, and The Flash. The Flash was one of many collaborations Walker did with composer Danny Elfman. She was his conductor on projects such as Scrooged and Batman.
While managing her working relationships with Elfman and Fiedel, Shirley would mentor and collaborate with up-and-comer, Hans Zimmer (who  would provide synths for Mask Of The Phantasm). She would orchestrate and/or conduct his scores for Black Rain (1989), Bird On A Wire (1990), Backdraft (1991), A League Of Their Own (1992), and Toys (1992), to name a few. She would also collaborate with Carter Burwell at the end of her orchestrating/conducting-for-others days, including the incredible score for Fear (1996).

She served as a Board Member (1986–1994) and Vice President (1988–1992) for The Society of Composers & Lyricists (SCL), often speaking out on behalf of composers and their working conditions.  Articles and interviews are written by and about Shirley Walker in the SCL's publication, THE SCORE, a publication in print since 1986 by and about professional film/television/video game composers, songwriters and lyricists—and where Shirley spoke her mind.

Walker's Work with DC Comics 
Walker was a key part of bringing the DC Comics to life. “Though Shirley had enjoyed her stint composing for [The Flash],” notes Batman Animated, an art-book and history of the show, “she thought the last thing she wanted to do was to work on a cartoon version of Batman.”  Still, she met with producers, and was so impressed with the direction of the show’s art and the intended depth of its characters that she agreed to come onboard. Her relationship with Danny Elfman facilitated the use of that film’s music in the series, though Walker also composed her own equally memorable theme. You can hear her explain the difference between the two pieces of music, the tonal sections of her Batman theme and how she would blend them together to map over the show’s various moods and scenes, in this track from the soundtrack album.

She served as composer for Batman: The Animated Series (1992–1995), Superman: The Animated Series (1996–2000), The New Batman Adventures (1997–1999), and Batman Beyond (1999–2001); setting a standard for the musical tone of the DC Animated Universe.

Bruce Timm, who co-created the series alongside Eric Radomski, told Vulture he was watching "The Flash" starring John Wesley Shipp and recognized the score sounded familiar. Surely enough, they found out that it was Shirley Walker who was working on it. The rest is history, according to Timm: "I made a note as I was watching it: Who did the music? It was Shirley Walker. Did some research on Shirley Walker, found out that she had actually worked with Danny on that first 'Batman' movie, and had orchestrated much of it. We contacted Shirley and she was happy to come in and do the show. Back then, it was almost unheard of to score every single episode of a show. Fortunately, we mentioned it to our boss, Jean [MacCurdy], and she said, 'Oh, yeah! We should totally have an original score for every episode!' That was a huge plus."

Following the success of Batman and Batman Returns (1992), Batman: The Animated Series (1992–1995) was created. Danny Elfman composed the main theme and Shirley Walker wrote additional themes. She became one of the show’s primary composers/directors. This ultimately led to Walker scoring the animated feature, Batman: Mask Of The Phantasm (1993), which is still one of her most highly-regarded works. As another example of the fun which Shirley would inspire in music and performances, the lyrics which the choir sing throughout the Mask Of The Phantasm score, often presumed to be in Latin or some similar language, are actually the names off all the orchestra members backwards, so what’s being sung is essentially nonsense – silly, yet effective. Shirley would continue to compose and shepherd the music of sequel series’, The New Batman Adventures (1997–1999) and Batman Beyond (1999–2001). She even returned to Batman on film one last time in 1995 with uncredited orchestration on Batman Forever.

Walker worked with Danny Elfman on many DC Comics works. She served as conductor for the film Batman, wrote most of the scores for Batman: The Animated Series using a theme inspired by Elfman's, scored the pilot and all the episodes of The Flash (the main theme was written by Elfman) and scored episodes of Batman Beyond with Michael McCuistion, Lolita Ritmanis and Kristopher Carter. Though her involvement in the DC Animated Universe ended after Beyond, several of her themes would be used in Justice League and Justice League Unlimited.

She would go on to work on Superman: The Animated Series and Batman Beyond, setting the musical, well, tone for the slew of DC Animated Universe shows that spun out of Batman: TAS — an interconnected cinematic universe including Static Shock, Justice League and Justice League Unlimited.

Honors/Awards
For her work on Batman: The Animated Series and Batman Beyond, Shirley won two Daytime Emmy’s in 1998 and 2001, respectively. Although these were the only awards she ever received, her legacy continued.

Death and legacy 
Just recently after completing work on the feature “Black Christmas” and after finishing all three scores of the “Final Destination” horror series, Shirley Walker died November 30, 2006 from complications following a stroke in Reno, NV. She was only 61 years old. Walker is survived by her two sons, Ian and Colin.

According to fellow composer and friend Laura Karpman, Walker was among the few female composers who managed to make her mark in the highly competitive world of Hollywood scoring: “She’s one of a tiny little group, and was the first one to poke through,” Karpman said. “She’s been an incredible mentor to a lot of men and women in Hollywood. She was an important role model.”  Not only did Walker compose, she also conducted, orchestrated, arranged, and oftentimes did all three. Walker had an incredible impact not only on the films and television shows she worked on, but also on the musicians she worked with. When Warner Bros. hired her in 1990 to supervise the music for Batman: The Animated Series, Walker decided to see if she “could find the next generation of orchestral film composers and give them a chance to do this work,” Walker told Daily Variety in 2002. According to a statement by one of more than 30 composers Walker brought in to work on the Batman series, Walker’s “determination to open doors of opportunity for aspiring composers is unrivaled in our industry.” Walker not only supported up-and-coming composers in the industry, she also watched over the orchestra and ensured the musicians would not burn out. In the DVD commentary for Final Destination, Walker recounts a time when there was a problem with music being recorded for a Disney picture she was conducting. The composer and producers were sitting in the control booth, playing back the recordings and bickering, leaving the musicians idle for forty-five minutes. Rather than have them be paid to do nothing, the producers suggested to Shirley that they rehearse music not yet recorded. Shirley agreed but quietly told the orchestra how she felt this was ridiculous, that she didn’t want them wearing out, and she had a different plan. In this particular studio, Shirley was on an elevated platform to where the orchestra was essentially hidden below and only Shirley could be seen from the booth. She utilized this, and knowing that the orchestra couldn’t actually be heard unless recording was in progress, she mimed conducting, waving her arms, pointing to the score, and completely putting on an act for the producers, but all the while telling jokes and keeping things light with the musicians.

Despite the fact that very few female composers had worked in Hollywood at the time of her death, Walker was not recognized during the “In Memoriam” segment of the 79th Academy Awards. Walker is one of the industry’s most unsung talents, often overlooked in popular media even with the strides she has made for women composers, and her huge influence in the film industry, such as being the first woman to receive sole composing credit on a Hollywood studio picture, on “Memoirs of an Invisible Man” in 1992.

However, in 2014, 8 years after Walker’s passing, The American Society of Composers, Authors, and Publishers (ASCAP) created the Shirley Walker Award to honor those whose achievements have contributed to the diversity of film and television music. It has been awarded to Wendy Melvoin and Lisa Coleman, Deborah Lurie, Germain France, and Pinar Toprak to date.

Film scores

Television scores (partial)

Works for other composers

References

External links 
 
 
CineMusic: Shirley Walker - a website devoted to the music of Shirley Walker
Shirley Walker speaking at the annual meeting of The Society of Composers & Lyricists (SCL)
Film Music Society Appreciation

1945 births
2006 deaths
20th-century American composers
20th-century American conductors (music)
20th-century American women musicians
20th-century women composers
21st-century American composers
21st-century American conductors (music)
21st-century American women musicians
21st-century women composers
American film score composers
American television composers
American women film score composers
American women in electronic music
Animation composers
La-La Land Records artists
Musicians from California
People from Napa, California
Varèse Sarabande Records artists
Women conductors (music)
Women television composers